The City of London is unique in that the post of lord-lieutenant is held in commission. The Lord Mayor of the City of London is the head of the Commission of Lieutenancy.

Lieutenants 

All current members were appointed on December 24, 2021 by letters patent under the Great Seal.

The Lieutenancy has a number of ex officio members. These members are currently:

 The Lord Mayor of London
 Currently: Nicholas Lyons
 Past Lord Mayors who are still Aldermen
 Currently: Ian Luder, Nick Anstee, Sir David Wootton, Sir Alan Yarrow, Sir Andrew Parmley, Sir Charles Bowman, Sir Peter Estlin, Sir William Russel
 The senior Alderman below the Chair
 Currently: Nicholas Lyons
 The Recorder of London
 Currently: Mark Lucraft
 The Common Serjeant of London
 Currently: Richard Marks
 The Governor of the Bank of England
 Currently: Andrew Bailey
 The head of another major financial institution
 Currently: Dame Elizabeth Corley (chair of the board of the Impact Investing Institute)
 The Commissioner of the City of London Police
 Currently: Angela McLaren
 Chair of the City of London Reserve Forces' and Cadets' Association
 Currently: Paul Hill

References

Notes 

City of London
London